Abderrahman Sadik Karim born at 2 March 1962 in Kirkuk was Minister of Environment in the first cabinet appointed by the Interim Iraq Governing Council in September 2003. A Kurd, Karim is an engineer and environmental activist.

References
 

Government ministers of Iraq
Iraqi Kurdistani politicians
Living people
Year of birth missing (living people)